The personnel of the English rock group Pink Floyd has changed several times. The group was founded in 1965 by Syd Barrett on guitar and lead vocals, Nick Mason on drums, Roger Waters on bass and vocals, and Richard Wright on keyboards and vocals. Guitarist and vocalist David Gilmour would later join the band in January 1968, while Barrett was ousted from the band in April 1968 due to deteriorating mental health. From the 1970s onwards, they were augmented by additional personnel in the studio and on stage. Following creative tensions, Wright left Pink Floyd in 1981, followed by Waters in 1985. Wright rejoined as a session musician and, later, band member. Mason is the only member to appear on all studio releases.

Official members

Touring members

Session member

Timelines

Official members

Touring timeline

Members of early antecedents
In addition to the official members of Pink Floyd, there were several members of bands that preceded it. These bands performed at various times as Sigma 6, the Meggadeaths, the Abdabs (or the Screaming Abdabs), Leonard's Lodgers, the Spectrum Five, and the Tea Set.

References

Sources
 

 
Pink Floyd